KTTO (970 kHz) is an AM radio station in Spokane, Washington, serving the Spokane metropolitan area. The station is currently owned by Sacred Heart Radio, Inc.  It airs a Catholic radio format with most programming provided by the EWTN Radio Network.

KTTO's transmitter is located off East Thurston Avenue in Spokane.  Programming is also heard on FM translator station K291CO, powered at 155 watts, broadcasting at 106.1 MHz.

History
The station first signed on as KREM in 1946.  It originally broadcast at 1340 kilocycles, at a power of 250 watts.  KREM was owned by Cole E. Wylie, who served as president and general manager.  By the 1950s, it had moved to its current spot on the dial, AM 970, powered at 5,000 watts by day, 1,000 watts at night.

In 1955, it put Spokane's first FM station on the air, 92.9 KREM-FM (now KZZU-FM). They were joined by KREM-TV in 1954. In the 1950s and 60s, when few people owned FM radios, KREM-FM simulcast the AM station's programming.  In 1957, KREM-AM-FM-TV were acquired by Seattle-based King Stations.  In the 1960s, KREM became a Top 40 station, vying with AM 790 KJRB for Spokane's young radio listeners.  KREM-FM switched to a progressive rock sound in the late 1960s.

On October 16, 1987, the station changed its call sign to KHIT, playing hits of the 1950s, 60s and 70s.  On February 22, 1988, it became KTRW, playing country music.  The KTRW call letters are now on a Christian radio station at AM 630.  On September 29, 2005, it switched to the current KTTO.

On November 20, 2015 KTTO was granted a Federal Communications Commission construction permit to increase daytime power to 5,300 watts and decrease nighttime power to 750 watts. In 2017, KTTO added an FM translator at 106.1 MHz.

References

External links
FCC History Cards for KTTO
 

Radio stations established in 1947
1985 establishments in Washington (state)
TTO
TTO
Catholic radio stations